John Thomas Steinbock (July 16, 1937 – December 5, 2010) was an American prelate of the Roman Catholic Church. He served as the fourth bishop of the Diocese of Fresno in California from 1991 until his death in 2010.

Steinbock previously served as an auxiliary bishop of the Diocese of Orange in California from 1984 to 1987 and as bishop of the Diocese of Santa Rosa in California from 1987 to 1991.

Biography

Early life 
Steinbock was born on July 16, 1937, in Los Angeles, California.  He was ordained to the priesthood for the Archdiocese of Los Angeles by Cardinal James McIntyre on May 1, 1963. He then served as associate pastor in two parishes in East Los Angeles. In 1972, he was appointed administrator of Santa Isabel Parish in East Los Angeles. Steinbock later became associate pastor (1973) and parochial vicar (1981) of St. Vibiana's Cathedral. 

He served as president of the Los Angeles Priests' Council from 1979 to 1980, as well as a member of the Board of Consultors of the archdiocese from 1979 to 1982.

Auxiliary Bishop of Orange 
On May 29, 1984, Steinbock was appointed auxiliary bishop of the Diocese of Orange and titular bishop of Midila by Pope John Paul II. He received his episcopal consecration on July 14, 1984, from Cardinal Timothy Manning, with Bishops William Johnson and Manuel Moreno serving as co-consecrators.  Steinbock chose as his personal motto "All for the love of God."

Steinbock became vicar general of the diocese on July 18, 1984, and diocesan administrator on July 29, 1986.

Bishop of Santa Rosa 
John Paul II named Steinbock as the third bishop of the Diocese of Santa Rosa on January 27, 1987.

Bishop of Fresno 
John Paul II appointed Steinbock as the fourth bishop of the Diocese of Fresno on October 15, 1991.

In 2003, Steinbock published Ministry of Presence, a book of 100 vignettes from his 21 years ministering to the poor, immigrants and gang members in East Los Angeles and skid row. He wrote: "One may not be able to respond to the many problems in people's lives, but one can be with them in their sufferings and joys. And the priest is with the people, so that they understand that the Lord Jesus is with them, loving them, suffering with them."

Retirement and legacy 
Steinbock died on December 5, 2010, in Fresno at age 73. He had been diagnosed with cancer in August and had been hospitalized at St. Agnes Medical Center in Fresno due to blood clots for about a month before his death.

References

Episcopal succession

1937 births
2010 deaths
People from Los Angeles
Roman Catholic Archdiocese of Los Angeles
Roman Catholic bishops of Santa Rosa in California
20th-century Roman Catholic bishops in the United States
21st-century Roman Catholic bishops in the United States
Deaths from cancer in California
People from East Los Angeles, California